The Montenegrin Second League of Women's Handball is the lower Women's team handball league in Montenegro. It is organized by the Handball Federation of Montenegro. The league comprises five teams.

Clubs for the 2007/2008 season 
ŽRK 067 - Podgorica
ŽRK Berane - Berane
ŽRK Danilovgrad - Danilovgrad
ŽRK Devetka II - Podgorica
ŽRK Gorica - Podgorica
ŽRK Slobodan

Winners
2006/2007 - ŽRK Biseri (Pljevlja)

External links 
Handball Federation of Montenegro

Second Women's League
Women's handball leagues
Women's handball in Montenegro
Women's sports leagues in Montenegro